"Perfect World" is a song written by James Mercer and Brian Burton of the American alternative rock band Broken Bells. It was originally recorded by the band for their second studio album, After the Disco, where it appears as the opening track on the album. A "Perfect World" promotional single was released for streaming on the Australian branch of commercial music streaming service Spotify on February 4, 2014, becoming the third release by the band in promotion of After the Disco, after singles "Holding On for Life" and "After the Disco."

Composition
The song was written in the context of After the Disco, where most of the lyrics and music center around a common theme of the party and the morning after, usually in the form of a metaphor for a break-up in a relationship. The song's hook, which had been described by vocalist James Mercer as having a sense of "shamefulness", were the first lyrics written for the song, serving as the inspirational basis for the rest of the song's lyrics. Mercer spoke to National Public Radio, stating:
"That hook came somewhere along the line. ... I remember when it did happen, though, that it felt like, okay, well, there's like a shamelessness to it, with the keyboard sound and the real, over-the-top melody. It was like, 'So what, man?' We grew up listening to things that were big, but they were sad, too. So, it was like, well, we can be big as long as it's as sad as [our music gets]. It's just there. So we didn't really dial it back too much."

Recording
"Perfect World" was first written and recorded well into the recording sessions for After the Disco, borrowing elements from the title track, "After the Disco", a track which they had finished working on by the time "Perfect World" had been conceived. A chord progression for the song was the first written element of the song; instruments and vocals were recorded later on. Two versions of "Perfect World" were originally created by the band; one version presenting the song as a lighter, yet fast-paced melody and one presenting it as a heavier, slower melody. The final version of the track that appears as the opening track on After the Disco features elements of both of the original versions of the track, mixing it into a single track.

Track listing

Personnel
Adapted from After the Disco liner notes.

Release history

References

2014 singles
Broken Bells songs
2014 songs
Columbia Records singles
Songs written by Danger Mouse (musician)
Songs written by James Mercer (musician)
Song recordings produced by Danger Mouse (musician)